Endre Bán (1 June 1934  in Marcali, Hungary – 24 July 1995 in Szombathely, Hungary) was a Hungarian Catholic priest, theologian, and professor.

Bán went to secondary grammar school in Pécs, called Nagy Lajos Gimnázium, where he graduated in 1952. Subsequently, he attended at the Theological College (Hittudományi Akadémia) in Budapest. He became a priest in 1957. He graduated as the doctor of theology in 1958. He was not allowed by the Communist authorities to work as a priest between 1962 and 1965.

Sources 

Pécs Lexikon  I. (A–M). főszerkesztő Romváry Ferenc, Pécs Lexikon Kulturális Nonprofit Kft. 2010, Pécs. 69–70. o. 

Hungarian academics
1934 births
1995 deaths
People from Marcali
20th-century Hungarian Roman Catholic priests